The Sun Charm 39 is a French sailboat that was designed by Jacques Fauroux as a cruiser and first built in 1988.

The Sun Charm's basic hull design was developed into the Sun Fast 39 racer in 1989 and the cruising Sun Odyssey 39 in 1990.

Production
The design was built by Jeanneau in France, starting in 1988, but it is now out of production.

Design
The Sun Charm 39 is a recreational keelboat, built predominantly of fiberglass, with wood trim. It has a masthead sloop rig. The hull has a raked stem, a reverse transom with steps to a swimming platform, an internally mounted spade-type rudder controlled by a wheel and a fixed fin keel or optional shoal draft keel. It displaces  and carries  of ballast.

The design has sleeping accommodation for six people, with a double "V"-berth in the bow cabin and two aft cabins, each with a double berth. The main cabin has a "U" shaped settee around a rectangular table on the port side. The galley is located on the starboard side amidships. The galley is equipped with a stove, an ice box and a double sink. A navigation station is aft of the galley, on the starboard side. There are two heads, one forward of each aft cabin.

For sailing downwind the design may be equipped with a symmetrical spinnaker.

See also
List of sailing boat types

References

External links

Keelboats
1980s sailboat type designs
Sailing yachts
Sailboat type designs by Jacques Fauroux
Sailboat types built by Jeanneau